Stephen Mark O'Doherty (born 26 October 1959) is a former Australian politician and former member of the Liberal Party.

Early life and career
O'Doherty was born in Melbourne and raised in New South Wales. He attended Carlingford High School, a public school in the north-western suburbs of Sydney. He received a B.A. (Communication) from the New South Wales Institute of Technology and has a Master of Education (Professional Leadership and Training) from the Christian College of Higher Education. 

From 1981 until his election to Parliament, he was a broadcaster and journalist in radio and TV. During the 1980s he was the host of the Sundown Rundown current affairs program on Sydney's 2GB, and was a state and national affairs reporter with The 7.30 Report and Network Ten. He is a regular commentator on politics and the media on 702 ABC Sydney and Sky News Australia.

Political career
In 1992 O'Doherty was elected as a member of the New South Wales Legislative Assembly for the seat of Ku-ring-gai.  In 1999 he was re-elected to the seat of Hornsby following a redistribution of electoral boundaries.  From 1995, he served as a front bencher in the Liberal Opposition under Peter Collins and Kerry Chikarovski, first in the portfolios of Education and Community Services, and then serving as Shadow Treasurer until his resignation in 2002.

Post-politics
In January 2002, O'Doherty left Parliament to become the inaugural Chief Executive Officer of Christian Schools Australia, a national association representing Christian schools. He held this post until the end of 2016, in order to pursue other media interests.

He currently is the chair of Hope Media, a not-for-profit Christian radio broadcaster. In March 2017, he returned to regular radio broadcasting on Hope Media's Hope 103.2 channel as host of its Open House current affairs program.

Personal and community life
O'Doherty is married with two sons.

He is an accomplished musician and composer; O'Doherty grew up playing clarinet in the Golden Kangaroos Hornsby Concert Band, a community concert and marching band based in the north of Sydney. He is currently the band's musical director and principal conductor.

References

 

1959 births
Living people
Australian Christians
Members of the New South Wales Legislative Assembly
Liberal Party of Australia members of the Parliament of New South Wales
21st-century Australian politicians